Severin Fortress is a set of historical monuments located on the territory of Drobeta Turnu Severin, Romania. In the National Archaeological Repertory, the monument appears with the code 109782.07.01.

References

External links

Rock castles
Tourist attractions in Romania
Museums in Romania
Drobeta-Turnu Severin